Rosa Margaret Morris (16 July 1914 – 15 October 2011) was a Welsh applied mathematician, working in potential theory and aerodynamics. When she was 23, her research and examination results made national news. In her later career, she taught at the University College of South Wales and Monmouthshire (now Cardiff University), where she co-authored a successful textbook on Mathematical Methods of Physics and became one of the first female Heads of School of Mathematics in the United Kingdom.

Early life and education 
Morris was born in Rogerstone, Monmouthshire, the youngest child of John and Mary Aline Morris, . Her father, who died when she was young, was the headmaster of the elementary school in Rogerstone, and her mother was a schoolmistress. Morris first attended Rogerstone School, then Pontywaun County School, Pontymister, Risca, from 1926 to 1932, with Distinctions in Pure and Applied Mathematics. She studied mathematics at the University College of South Wales and Monmouthshire in Cardiff, graduating with a first class degree in 1936 and continuing as a research student until 1938, working under the supervision of George Henry Livens. During this time, Morris, aged 23, published her first articles, on potential theory and aerodynamics. Her approach showed "the advantages of using the complex variable in [...] boundary problems of mathematical physics" and made national news, including an interview, with human interest stories focusing on her as a "mathematical genius", having "found a method of solving problems in aerodynamics which have hitherto defied all mathematicians". She was described as a "keen hockey player and accomplished dressmaker", and University College of South Wales and Monmouthshire Principal Frederick Rees stated that at her examination, she would have been entitled to 130 percent compared to the next best student, and a special case had to be made for her to avoid handicapping other students. Short reports on her achievements were also printed in American local newspapers. She won scholarships worth £600 for the first year at Girton College, Cambridge, where she was a M. T. Meyer research student. Her fellowships and awards included a University of Wales Fellowship (1938–1940) and a Department of Scientific and Industrial Research Senior Research Award (1939–1941). After three years as a research student, one of them in Cardiff, two in Cambridge, she obtained her PhD from Cambridge University in 1940, with the thesis Two-dimensional potential theory, with special reference to aerodynamic problems. Her Cambridge advisor was Geoffrey Ingram Taylor.

Professional career 
Morris graduated with a PhD in 1940 and became a faculty member in Cardiff in 1941, where she stayed for the rest of her career. She supervised the 1955 PhD thesis of David Edmunds, who later won the Pólya Prize. Together with Roy Chisholm, Morris wrote a textbook on Mathematical Methods in Physics. Although it was lacking in rigour, it was reprinted several times, and, according to Chisholm, "in the late 1960's, North-Holland told us that we had broken their publication record for technical books. We even made a little money." In 1972–1973, while she was a Reader in Fluid Dynamics, she served as one of the first female heads of a mathematics department in the UK, possibly the first at a university.

Morris was a member of the London Mathematical Society (since 1945) of the Mathematical Association, where she was President of the Cardiff Branch 1955–1956, and a Fellow of the Cambridge Philosophical Society until 1983. She was a prolific contributor to Mathematical Reviews, with 188 contributions credited to her name.

Publications 
Morris published research articles on potential theory, fluid dynamics (especially moving aerofoils), and mathematical elasticity theory.

References

External links 
 

1914 births
2011 deaths
Welsh mathematicians
People from Monmouthshire
Alumni of Cardiff University
Alumni of Girton College, Cambridge
Women mathematicians
Academics of Cardiff University